This is a list of models and clones of Amiga computers.

Development
The first Amiga computer was the "Lorraine" developed using the Sage IV system. It consisted of a stack of breadboarded circuit boards.

Production timeline

Commodore Amiga models

Original Chipset (OCS)

Enhanced Chipset (ECS)

Advanced Graphics Architecture (AGA)

PowerPC-based AmigaOS models (post Commodore)
These models are not hardware compatible with the 68k Amigas.

Video chipsets

Unproduced chipsets 
These chipsets were planned but never fabricated.

Other AmigaOS compatible computers
Some computers were released by other companies which were AmigaOS compatible.
 DraCo: Released by MacroSystem in 1994. This was a high end machine which ran AmigaOS 3.1, but did not include the Amiga chipset, instead using a graphics card. A second version was known as the Draco Vision. A newer model, the Draco Casablanca, was released in 1997. The machines featured a 68040 or 68060 CPU.
 The Access: Released by Index Information in 1998. This was an Amiga compatible similar to the A1200, but on a motherboard which could fit into a standard 5 1/4" drive bay. It featured either a 68020 or 68030 CPU, with a redesigned AGA chipset, and ran AmigaOS 3.1.
 Minimig is a hardware compatible open source re-implementation of an Amiga 500 using a field-programmable gate array (FPGA).
 Vampire V4 Standalone, released by Apollo Team in 2019, provides ECS/AGA chipset re-implementation, plus "68080" CPU and "Super AGA" graphics, also using a field-programmable gate array (FPGA).
 The Pegasos II and Sam440ep can run AmigaOS 4.

Unreleased models
Prototypes:
 A3500: Prototype of the Amiga 3000T, it was housed in a Commodore PC60-III tower case.

Due to management turmoil, some viable Amiga models under development were cancelled prior to release:
 A3000+: Prototyped in 1991, it used the AGA chipset and had an AT&T DSP3210 chip, high-fidelity audio, telephone line interface, and 2.5 Mbit/s RS-485 network port.
 A1000+: Intermediate in price and features between the A1200 and A3000+, it would have been a detached keyboard system with expansion slots (two Zorro slots, video slot, CPU slot).

Unreleased models (after Commodore)
A number of new Amiga models were announced after the end of the Commodore model era. However, very few of them were ever produced beyond simple prototypes (if they even got that far). Some of these were announced by companies who later owned, or sought to own, the Amiga rights. Others were unofficial machines which would run AmigaOS, whilst others still were intended to run an operating system compatible with Amiga software. Some models that were never produced include:
 The Amiga Walker: Announced early 1996 by Amiga Technologies, this was supposed to be a new, compact Amiga computer. Its case design was very weird: The metallic grey case, about the size of a games console, was curved at the rear. Jokes were made comparing the shape to that of a vacuum cleaner. There were two more-or-less working prototypes of the Walker and it was never released into the mass market.
 The A\box, pre\box and AMIRAGE K2: These were PowerPC-based machines announced by the German company Phase5. The A\box, announced in 1996, was to feature a new custom graphics chipset named Caipirinha, and a new Amiga-compatible operating system. This was replaced in 1998 by the announcement of the pre\box, which was to feature four PowerPC processors, and was to run AmigaOS 3.1. Finally, in 1999 the AMIRAGE K2 was announced, based on the QNX operating system.
 The Amiga 40x0L models: QuikPak announced a range of machines while they were planning to purchase rights to the Amiga during late 1996 and early 1997. These were models with a 68030, 68040 or 68060 processor, and included portable "luggable" versions. Some models were planned to be fitted with NewTek's Video Toaster Flyer. QuikPak were a manufacturer for the Amiga 4000T.
 The A5000 and A6000: These were new models announced by Power Computing in 1997. They originally featured a 68030 or 68040 for the A5000, and a 68060 for the A6000.
 The BoXeR: Designed by Mick Tinker at Access Innovations, and announced in 1997, the BoXeR was to be a new motherboard based on a Motorola 68040 or 68060 processor. Amongst other improvements over the Commodore motherboards of the time, it incorporated the aging AGA chipset into one chip. It never got far beyond the advanced prototyping stage. Tinker was also responsible for the Access, which was basically an Amiga 1200 that was re-jigged to fit into a full length 5.25" drive bay.
 The Amiga Multimedia Convergence Computer: Announced by Gateway in 1999. This was to feature a new operating system known as Amiga OE.

See also

 Amiga Sidecar

References

External links
 Amiga Models
 Marketed Commodore Amiga models (table)

Amiga